The Estadio Caliente Xoloitzcuintles is a multi-use stadium in Tijuana, Baja California, Mexico, that is mostly used for football matches.

The stadium hosts home matches for the football club Club Tijuana, who play in Liga MX, Mexico's top league. Estadio Caliente is also the home of the gridiron football team, Galgos de Tijuana, that competes in the LFA.

Stadium
The stadium was opened in November 2007, according to schedule. The stadium originally had a capacity of 13,333. Work on the stadium still continues today. The stadium will have a  final capacity of 33,333 once completed.

Stadium owner Jorge Hank Rhon's main reason for constructing the stadium was his wish to have a professional soccer club in the city.

Because the Mexican Federation of Association Football says that teams participating in the First Division must have a stadium with a capacity over 15,000, Club Tijuana officially became qualified for promotion to the Primera División de México when the capacity was increased.

The construction of the stadium was planned in two parts. The first part finished the ground and lower sections of the stadium. In the second phase, the stadium's capacity was increased. As of 2022, the stadium is still under construction. 

The design of the project was led by the architect Héctor Troncoso-Parraga.

Inside the stadium there are dormitories and recreational areas for the players and coaching staff. It includes rooms built similar to hotel rooms with double beds, bathrooms and television sets and Wi-Fi. While the recreational areas includes a pool table, foosball tables, an entertainment center a library and more.

Other uses

International football games
In 2009, the stadium hosted the eight-team CONCACAF Men's Under-17 Championship.

Boxing

On December 18, 2010, the stadium hosted a boxing fight which featured Erik Morales against Francisco Lorenzo. Morales won the fight.

Concerts
Artists such as Shakira, Daddy Yankee, Karol G, Nicky Jam, Maná, Luis Miguel, Gloria Trevi, Megadeth, Guns N' Roses, Los Bukis and Alejandro Sanz have performed at the stadium. Rauw Alejandro is set to perform at the stadium on June 10, 2023.

Notes

References

External links

Football venues in Mexico
Sports venues in Tijuana
2006 establishments in Mexico